Neva Jane Langley Fickling (January 25, 1933 – November 18, 2012) was an American beauty pageant queen.

Biography
Langley was born in Lakeland, Florida.  As a college sophomore she transferred to Wesleyan College in Macon, Georgia, where she was a member of Alpha Delta Pi sorority. While attending that college she became Miss Macon, Miss Georgia, and then Miss America 1953.

Ms. Langley's first television appearance as Miss America was on What's My Line (September 14, 1952) as the mystery guest. She rode the grand prize most-beautiful float by a commercial firm, called "America The Beautiful", in the January 1, 1953 Tournament of Roses Parade in Pasadena, California. During her reign as Miss America, she was hospitalized for one week with pneumonia. She was also known for being the only Miss Georgia to win the Miss America pageant until Betty Cantrell was crowned Miss America 2016, sixty-three years later.

Exhibitions 
Langley has been featured in museum exhibitions, including a display at the Kimball Art Center (2009) of eleven original gowns worn in beauty pageant competitions and during her reign as Miss America, and the exhibition "Georgia's Miss Americas" at the Museum of Arts and Sciences (Sept. 23, 2017–Jan. 14, 2018).

Personal life
Langley married insurance executive, William A. Fickling Jr., in 1955 and was the mother of four children (William, Jane, Julia and Roy).

On November 18, 2012, Langley died of cancer at the age of 79.

References

External links 
 

1933 births
2012 deaths
Miss America 1950s delegates
Miss America Preliminary Talent winners
Miss America winners
People from Lakeland, Florida